The SS Indiana was a freighter built in 1848. It was built with an 18-foot steam engine with an Erickson Screw Propeller. It served Lake Superior as a passenger ship and became a transporter for iron ore after the Soo Locks opened. It shipwrecked on June 6, 1858, at Crisp Point Light. The boat started leaking near the propeller shaft during a storm. It was carrying iron ore from Marquette, Michigan during the time of its accident.

In 1979, the Smithsonian Institution, the United States Army Corps of Engineers and the United States Navy salvaged the steam engine from Lake Superior. The engine and related artifacts are held in the collection of the National Museum of American History.

References

Shipwrecks of Lake Superior
1848 ships
Great Lakes freighters
Maritime incidents in June 1858